Veps is a Norwegian indie pop band from Oslo, Norway. The band consists of four members, Maja Beitrusten Berge (drums), Laura Dodson (vocals and guitar), Helena Mariero Olasveengen (vocals and keyboards) and June Urholt (bass).

History
The band was founded in 2018, when the girls went to middle school together and teamed up to make a short film, "Liv and Erle", which won an award at the Norwegian Amandusfestival in 2019. They later realised they shared the same musical interests and agreed to start a band together at the age of 14. The band was invited to play at the 2021 Great Escape Festival held annually in Brighton and Hove, England, the Reeperbahn Festival in Hamburg, as well as the Norwegian show case festivals Vill Vill Vest in Bergen and by:Larm in Oslo later the same year.

On November 28 2022 Veps were among the first acts to be announced to Øyafestivalen in August 2023.

Name
The name of the band, Veps, is Norwegian for wasp.

Record labels
Veps was signed to the independent record label Kanine Records in 2020. They released their first single, 'Ecstasy' on the label on 23 April 2021.

Music
'Ecstasy' peaked at 23 on the Spanish iTunes Top 100 Alternative Songs Chart. The band released their first EP, 'Open the Door', on Kanine Records on 11 June 2021. The EP was mixed by the Norwegian producer Matias Tellez. Caitlin Mincher of the music site, 'WhentheHornBlows' remarked that the EP is "the perfect bridge between the unique and the familiar. Open the Door is a gorgeous blend of 90’s angst and raw instrumentals, and it’s a debut that’s beyond promising", while Atwood Magazine said it "introduces a vibrant new artistry, sets a high bar, and makes room for growth in all directions".

Following the 'Open the Door' EP the band released the single 'His brother' in October 2021. In March 2022 they released another single, 'Ballerina (Norah)', which led to Veps being picked as the Spotlight Artist of the week at the BBC Radio 6 Music show New Music Fix by Steve Lamacq on Friday March 25 2002. God Is in the TV wrote about 'Ballerina (Norah)' that it "is a impossibly catchy hook laden track (..) swelling with wonderful harmonies to a wonderful chorus that teeters on that balance beam of affection and insecurity. Both singles were released on Kanine Records.

On September 16 2022 Veps announced their forthcoming debut album Oslo Park, to be released on November 18 2022 on Kanine Records. At the same time they released the single "Mooney Tunes" which according to Paste Magazine "sharpens Veps' warm indie-rock sound to a fine point, yet maintains the dreamy whimsy of their earlier material".

Musical style and influences
Their music style is described as alt rock with a strong ’90s vibes as well as fusing alt-pop with indie rock elements.

Discography

LPs

EPs

Singles

Music videos

Filmography

Television

References

External links
 
 
 
 

Musical groups from Oslo
2018 establishments in Norway
Kanine Records artists
Norwegian indie rock groups
Norwegian indie pop groups
Musical groups established in 2018
Musical quartets
All-female bands